Galbárruli is a village in the province and autonomous community of La Rioja, Spain.

References

Populated places in La Rioja (Spain)